The Beasts Are on the Streets is a 1978 American made-for-television thriller film produced by Hanna-Barbera Productions (although known as an animation studio, this was one of several live-action Hanna-Barbera productions), directed by Peter R. Hunt and starring Carol Lynley, Billy Green Bush and Philip Michael Thomas. It was filmed on location in Grand Prairie, Texas and Arlington, Texas and originally broadcast on NBC on May 18, 1978.

Plot 
A careening tanker truck rips through the fence of a Texas wildlife preserve, unleashing an untamed force of wild animals on an unsuspecting community which includes bison, zebras, camels, antelopes, ostriches, elephants, lions, rhinos, tigers and bears. Dr. Claire McCauley, a dedicated veterinarian, works with Kevin Johnson, the head ranger of the wildlife park, to manage the situation.

They are both joined by park rangers and local police officers as they desperately scramble to recapture the escaped animals while two trigger-happy hunters, Jim Scudder and Al Loring, decide to go big-game hunting amid this community chaos. The movie also stars David Little in his acting debut. David would go on to have a long career in motion pictures including a much celebrated cameo in a RUSH video.

Cast 
 Carol Lynley – Dr. Claire McCauley
 Dale Robinette – Kevin Johnson
 Billy Green Bush – Jim Scudder 
 Philip Michael Thomas – Eddie Morgan
 Casey Biggs – Rick
 Burton Gilliam – Al Loring
 Sharon Ullrick – Lucetta Gaynes 
 Anna Lee – Mrs. Jackson
 Bill Thurman – Carl Evans
 David Little - Child actor

DVD release 
On July 22, 2013, Warner Bros. released The Beasts Are on the Streets on DVD in Region 1 for the first time via their Warner Archive Collection. This is a Manufacture-on-Demand (MOD) release, available through Warner's online store and Amazon.com.

References

External links 
 
 
 

1978 television films
1978 films
1970s thriller films
American horror thriller films
NBC network original films
Hanna-Barbera films
Films directed by Peter R. Hunt
American natural horror films
Films about bears
Films about birds
Films about elephants
Films about lions
Films about rhinoceroses
Films about tigers
Films set in Texas
Films shot in Texas
Films scored by Gerald Fried
American thriller television films
1970s English-language films
1970s American films